Bhadro ( Bhadrô) is the fifth month in the Bengali calendar.  Bhadro marks the beginning of autumn. According to the modified calendar developed by the Bangla Academy, the month of Bhadro has 31 days from 18 August to 17 September in Bangladesh.

Etymology 
Bhadro is named after the star Purbobhadropod ( Purbôbhadrôpôd).

Events 
 The national poet of Bangladesh, Kazi Nazrul Islam, died on 12 Bhadro 1383.

See also
Bengali calendar
Culture of Bangladesh

References

Months of the Bengali calendar